Collomia linearis is a species of flowering plant in the phlox family known by the common names tiny trumpet and slenderleaf collomia. This tiny wildflower is native to North America where it is fairly widespread across the north and west. It is an annual herb, rarely exceeding  in height, with a velvety erect stem bearing long, narrow green leaves. Atop the stem is a cluster of up to 20 white or light pink flowers, each about a centimeter across. Each has five small rounded petals and stamens tipped with anthers bearing white pollen.

References

External links

Jepson Manual Treatment
Photo gallery

linearis